Mary Moore (born July 23, 1948) is an American politician. She is a member of the Alabama House of Representatives from the 56th District, serving since 2002. She is a member of the Democratic party.

References

Living people
Democratic Party members of the Alabama House of Representatives
1948 births
21st-century American politicians
21st-century American women politicians